WGA may refer to:

In arts and entertainment:
 Web Gallery of Art
 Writers Guild of Alberta
 Writers Guild of America, an American union
 Writers Guild of America, East
 Writers Guild of America, West

Other uses:
 Wagga Wagga Airport (IATA code)
 RAAF Base Wagga (IATA code)
 Western Golf Association
 Western Governors Association, a group of American governors in western states and territories
 Western Growers Association, an association representing farmers in the states of California and Arizona
 Wheat Germ Agglutinin, a protein that protects wheat from insects, yeast and bacteria
 Windows Genuine Advantage
 Western Global Airlines
 Whole genome association study
 Whole of Government Accounts, accruals based accounts covering the whole of the UK public sector 
 World Goldpanning Association
 Wycliffe Global Alliance
 Phoenix-Mesa Gateway Airport, formerly Williams Gateway Airport